Kelly John Pollard (born 17 
November 1971), better known as John Pollard, is an English former footballer who played in the Football League as a defender for Colchester United.

Career

Born in Chelmsford, Pollard began his career with Witham Town before signing to Colchester United's youth team. He broke into the first-team picture at Layer Road early while still playing at youth level in the penultimate game of the 1988–89 season, coming on as a replacement for Mark Radford in a must-win game against Exeter City on 5 May 1989 to ensure league safety. He scored the third goal in the 83rd minute in a thumping 4–0 win, proving to be his only professional goal.

Pollard made 9 Football League appearances for the U's between his debut and the club's relegation from the Fourth Division in 1990, failing to play any Conference games for the club. He made his final appearance in a Conference League Cup 2–0 defeat to Sutton United on 26 February 1991 at Gander Green Lane. Following this, he was sent out on loan alongside teammate Steve Restarick to Fisher Athletic in March 1991.

Colchester released Pollard in the summer of 1991, as he went on to play for a number of non-league clubs including Bury Town and Heybridge Swifts, where in two spells he became the club's record appearance holder with over 550 starts. He separated his spells at Heybridge with a two-year stint at St Albans City, making 93 appearances and scoring nine times, later playing for AFC Sudbury between 2005 and 2007 and briefly Tiptree United before a move to Halstead Town in the summer of 2007. While with Halstead, he became player-assistant manager. Pollard then returned to management in the summer 2015, joining Coggeshall Town being appointed as assistant manager, achieving back to back promotions from the Essex Border League into the Eastern Counties League Premier Division. Pollards first season in the Thurlow Premier division was followed with being crowned champions to the bostik north.

References

1971 births
Living people
Sportspeople from Chelmsford
English footballers
Association football defenders
Colchester United F.C. players
Fisher Athletic F.C. players
Bury Town F.C. players
Heybridge Swifts F.C. players
St Albans City F.C. players
A.F.C. Sudbury players
Tiptree United F.C. players
Halstead Town F.C. players
English Football League players